Reencuentros is a collection of hits by Mexican pop singer Yuri. It was released in 1994.It sold more than 100,000 copies earning Gold disc..

Track listing 

 Producer: Yuri
 Conducted and directed by: Rudy Pérez, Mariano Pérez, Alejandro Zepeda and Gian Pietro Felisatti
 For: Sony Music Entertainment México, SA de CV

Singles
 Quiero Volver A Empezar
 Juntos (Ft. Uniko Ko)
 Volver A Empezar

Single Charts

1994 albums
Yuri (Mexican singer) albums